Irresistible Bliss is the second studio album by the American electronic music group Soul Coughing, released in 1996. The band initially planned for Tchad Blake, producer of their first album Ruby Vroom, to produce the album, but the death of a family member in a car accident caused Blake to take a hiatus. Over the objections of his bandmates and his record label, Slash Records/Warner Bros., frontman Mike Doughty (then billed as "M. Doughty") hired producer David Kahne (Fishbone, The Bangles, Sublime, Tony Bennett, Sugar Ray, The Strokes); he was intent on following up the wild sonics of Ruby Vroom with a tightly wound, trembly, New Wave–inspired record.

The tracking, at Manhattan's Power Station recording studio, was complete in eleven days, and Doughty was jubilant at the results. Doughty tapped Steve Fisk to produce the tune "Unmarked Helicopters" for The X-Files soundtrack Songs in the Key of X.

All of Irresistible Blisss songs were produced by Kahne, except tracks 2 and 6 (by Fisk) and track 12 by the band themselves. The mixing process split the tracks between three mixers: Kahne, Chris Shaw, and Ruby producer Tchad Blake, who intervened when bass player Sebastian Steinberg briefly quit the band.

Irresistible Bliss yielded a hit single for Soul Coughing, "Super Bon Bon." "Soft Serve" and "Soundtrack to Mary" also received some selective radio airplay.

Track listing
All songs by Doughty/Soul Coughing.

"Super Bon Bon" – 3:31
"Soft Serve" – 3:12
"White Girl" – 2:37
"Soundtrack to Mary" – 3:06
"Lazybones" – 4:48
"4 Out of 5" – 3:12
"Paint" – 2:55
"Disseminated" – 2:41
"Collapse" – 3:06
"Sleepless" – 4:50
"The Idiot Kings" – 3:57
"How Many Cans?" – 4:24
"Lemon Lime" (Japanese release bonus track)
"Blow My Only" (Japanese release bonus track)

Additional CD with Japanese release

"Super Bon Bon" (Propellerheads Mezzanine Remix)
"Mr. Bitterness" (live)
"White Girl" (live)
"Lazybones" (live)
"Super Bon Bon" (Kick Dub Mix)

Personnel
Mike Doughty (billed as "M. Doughty") – vocals, guitar
Sebastian Steinberg – bass, upright bass, backing vocals, fiddle
Mark de Gli Antoni – keyboards, turntables, programming
Yuval Gabay – drums, programming

Appearances in other media 

 "Super Bon Bon" appeared in the racing video game Gran Turismo 2 in 1999. Subsequently it was used in a car theft scene in the fifth-season finale of Homicide: Life on the Street. It is briefly featured in The Sopranos episode "Long Term Parking". It was played in season 4 episode 8 of ABC's Castle, and season 6 episode 2 of NBC's The Blacklist. It was also featured on ESPN & Netflix' 2020 docuseries The Last Dance.
 "Disseminated" was used in a late summer 2006 ad campaign for the Ford Transit. The song notably opens with the unflattering lines "The goat chewed up, once a tin can / The goat shat out, was a Ford sedan."

References

1996 albums
Soul Coughing albums
Albums produced by David Kahne
Albums produced by Steve Fisk
Slash Records albums